Estadio de la Victoria was a multi-use stadium in Jaen, Spain. It was initially used as the stadium of Real Jaén.  It was replaced by Nuevo Estadio de La Victoria in 2001.  The capacity of the stadium was 11,500 spectators.

External links
 Estadios de España

References

Defunct football venues in Spain
Estadio de la Victoria
Sports venues completed in 1944
Sport in Jaén, Spain
Buildings and structures in Jaén, Spain